Merton is a masculine given name which may refer to:

 Montague Merton Barker (1867–1954), English first-class cricketer and international field hockey player
 Merton J. Batchelder (1896–1975), United States Marine Corps brigadier general
 Merton Bernfield (1938–2002), American pediatrician and cell biologist
 Merton Brown (1913–2001), American classical music composer
 Merton E. Davies (1917–2001), a pioneer of America's space program
 Merton Hanks (born 1968), American former National Football League player
 Merton Hodge (1903–1958), New Zealand playwright
 Merton Verne Lundquist (born 1940), American sportscaster
 Merton Miller (1923–2000), American economist
 Merton L. Miller (c. 1870–1953), ethnologist and professor
 Merton Russell-Cotes (1835–1921), mayor of Bournemouth, England
 Merton Sealts (1915–2000), professor of English, particularly American literature

See also
 E. Merton Coulter (1890–1981), American historian, professor and author

English-language masculine given names